Function value may refer to:
 In mathematics, the value of a function when applied to an argument.
 In computer science, a closure.